James Onen (born 19 June 1975), known professionally as Fatboy, is a Ugandan award-winning radio presenter on the online station RX Radio. Onen hosts the  weekday radio program The Fat Boy Show from 6:00 Am– 10:00 AM  James Onen is a popular, albeit controversial DJ in Uganda for his unconventional views towards religion and superstition.

Personal life
Onen is currently single and lives with his dog, Rukia. Rukia is named after an anime character from the anime Bleach. He enjoys spending a lot of his time reading manga series.

Onen is quite vocal about his atheism and has set up organizations to combat superstition and mysticism in Uganda.

James is also an avid gamer and speaker of Japanese.

References

External links
 Reckless Radio

1975 births
Ugandan radio presenters
Ugandan atheists
People from Kampala
Place of birth missing (living people)
Living people